is a professional Japanese baseball player. He plays pitcher for the Chunichi Dragons.

External links

 NPB.com

1991 births
Living people
Baseball people from Wakayama Prefecture
Japanese baseball players
Nippon Professional Baseball pitchers
Chunichi Dragons players
2017 World Baseball Classic players